The EDSA Carousel is a bus rapid transit (BRT) system part of several bus routes in Metro Manila. It is situated along EDSA and other roads, running on a dedicated right-of-way called the EDSA Busway, separated from normal road traffic in most of its stretch by concrete barriers and steel bollards on the innermost lane.

Interim operations began on June 1, 2020, serving as a replacement of the former bus routes along EDSA, acting as an augmentation service to the MRT Line 3 due to the limited capacity restrictions put in place by the general community quarantine in Metro Manila as a result of the COVID-19 pandemic in the Philippines. Full operations began later on July 1, 2020. Intended to be largely served by bus stops along the median, some stops are temporarily served by bus stops on the curbside.

The line is operated by the Mega Manila Consortium Corporation and ES Transport and Partners Consortium under the supervision of the Department of Transportation (DOTr) and Metropolitan Manila Development Authority (MMDA).

History

Background
Epifanio de los Santos Avenue is the main thoroughfare of Metro Manila. Traffic congestion has always been a concern in the area and since 2007, the MMDA ordered buses to stay on the two right-most lanes of the road. Plastic barriers were later added in 2016.

A proposal for a bus rapid transit (BRT) system, using funds from the World Bank was approved in 2017. EDSA was intended to be the second phase of the implementation of the bus rapid transit system, following Quezon Avenue. Line 2, known as the Central Corridor, will be eventually realized as the EDSA Carousel.

Development
On March 16, 2020, the Inter-Agency Task Force for the Management of Emerging Infectious Diseases (IATF-EID) imposed a community quarantine due to the COVID-19 pandemic, which halted almost all public and private transportation using EDSA. This paved the way for the immediate construction of the EDSA Busway. Traffic in the EDSA Busway is restricted to authorized buses as well as emergency vehicles such as ambulances. The EDSA Carousel line is distinct from the World Bank-funded BRT project.

Opening
On July 1, 2020, the EDSA Carousel line, also designated as Route E, started its interim operations with a total of fifteen stops in a dedicated bus lane completed by the Metropolitan Manila Development Authority.

Proposed privatization and resumption of free rides

Due to the increasing amount of passengers as restrictions are slowly being relaxed, volumes of passengers began to increase as well. In the wake of increasing inflation and world market movements affecting currency values, free rides for the EDSA Carousel was announced for the remaining months of then-President Rodrigo Duterte's term. Upon Bongbong Marcos's assumption of the presidency, free rides were extended until the end of 2022, in spite of budgetary concerns. However, the free rides introduced problems of ridership capacity and the amount of buses available to serve passengers during rush hours.

Proposals to privatize the operations of the EDSA Carousel to further improve its services were explored. Transportation Secretary Jaime Bautista is open to such proposals, adding these must be "explored expeditiously."

Ridership
Since the line's opening in June 2020, the total ridership of the line 130,238,608 commuters within June 2020-November 2022. From June to December 2020, total ridership has reached a daily average 41,000 to 60,000 passengers, and continues to rise throughout 2021, wherein the daily average of commuters using the line is 129,000 passengers, with it's highest record reaching 160,000 passengers in June 2021. Total ridership in 2021 reached  47,104,197.

In 2022, the line's highest record reached a total of 404,010 passengers on October 24, 2022, while the average daily ridership through the year is 389,579 passengers. Total ridership also increased to a new record high, as the line served 80,832,186 passengers.

Stops

The line initially had 15 bus stops on its interim launch, with additional stops added in the following months. , 21 bus stops are currently operational. There are 87 operators and 751 authorized buses that serve the entire route.

Notes

Station layout

The line utilizes existing footbridges along EDSA by constructing additional stairways to the center island of EDSA. It also uses some stations of the MRT Line 3 and LRT Line 1 by making use of the train stations' emergency exit stairways. Some bus stops, such as the ones at Ayala (northbound), SM Mall of Asia, and Macapagal Boulevard, still use the existing stops on the curbside, while the Ayala southbound bus stop is located inside One Ayala.

Future

On November 16, 2020, the Department of Transportation (DOTr) signed an agreement with SM Prime Holdings, DM Wenceslao and Associates Inc., and Double Dragon Properties Corp. for the construction of EDSA busway bridges. The bridges will be shouldered by the three companies, seeking to provide safer, convenient, and PWD-friendly walkways for the riding public using the EDSA Carousel stops, and for pedestrians crossing EDSA. The pedestrian bridges were conceptualized with concourses, concierge, ticketing booths, and turnstiles for the automated fare collection system. Ramps and elevators would also be available to provide accessibility for PWDs, senior citizens, and pregnant passengers. The structures will be strategically located at the SM Mall of Asia, SM North EDSA, SM Megamall, Macapagal Boulevard in Aseana City and the corner of EDSA and Macapagal Boulevard. The groundbreaking ceremony for the EDSA Busway Concourse Project was held on May 18, 2021. It was expected to be completed in March 2022, but no updates have been announced since then.

On June 20, 2022, the Department of Transportation announced an additional 11 more stops would be added to the EDSA Carousel, which would bring the total number of stops to 29. As of January 2023, three of these proposed stops have been implemented.

Issues
On October 1, 2020, the "No Beep card, No entry" policy has been implemented to minimize physical contact between commuters and public transport personnel to reduce their risk of getting COVID-19 and to allow for more seamless and faster transactions to trim down the queuing of passengers. The new policy has drawn flak from commuters due to the current price of the card and its immediate implementation. Within the first week of its implementation, the Department of Transportation (DOTr) suspended the mandatory use of beep cards after AF Payments Incorporated refused the government's request to waive the  cost of Beep cards.
When the bus stops from Monumento to North Avenue were opened, the U-turn slots were closed, causing heavy traffic at the said portion. U-turn slots were reopened after few months to ease traffic flow. In November 2021, traffic lights were installed at the U-turn slots to address concerns both of the bus accessibility and the traffic congestion it causes.

Incidents and accidents

Multiple concrete barrier-related accidents were recorded since the EDSA Carousel's operations started. According to MMDA traffic czar Edison Nebrija, most of the drivers who crashed their vehicles against the barriers were speeding, drunk, or asleep behind the wheel. Some of the concrete barriers have already been replaced with steel bollards following a series of accidents.
 On April 13, 2022, the LRT-2 and MRT-3 were closed for its annual Holy Week maintenance from April 13 to 17. For the MRT-3, the EDSA Carousel filled in as an augmentation service. Despite being the third day of free rides under the government's service contracting program, the EDSA Carousel failed to keep up with the influx of demand as April 13 was still a work day and had higher ridership than in 2021 due to offices requiring workers to return to the workplace. As a result, many commuters struggled to go home as queues for the EDSA Carousel spilled out onto the road and its adjoining streets on all stops along the bus line. Many commuters remained stranded at the stops beyond midnight, and many opted to walk home instead. The lack of buses has also been attributed to a slow rollout of service contracting subsidies and high gasoline prices which influenced drivers and operators not to ply their routes, in fear of operating at a loss. Later that night, the LTFRB has since deployed skip buses to decongest the EDSA Carousel stops. Motorists along EDSA had also offered to give stranded commuters a ride. Commuters criticized the intensified anti-colorum operations that took place on the same day, disturbing any attempts for private individuals to rescue the stranded commuters. On April 14, the day after, Department of Transportation Secretary Arthur Tugade issued a formal apology for the situation, acknowledging the lack of buses, and promising not to allow the incident to happen again.

See also 
List of bus routes in Metro Manila
Cebu Bus Rapid Transit System

References

Bus rapid transit
Bus transportation in Metro Manila